Bob McClurg is an American actor.  He joined the Los Angeles-based improvisational comedy team The Groundlings and remained a member for six years, working with John Paragon, Susan Barnes, Phil Hartman and Paul Reubens. Edie McClurg is his younger sister.  He has not appeared in a film since 1987.

Filmography

References

External links

American male comedians
21st-century American comedians
American male film actors
Place of birth missing (living people)
Year of birth missing (living people)
Living people